Manlio Simonetti (2 May 1926 – 1 November 2017) was an Italian scholar of Patristics and the history of Biblical interpretation.

Biography

Simonetti was born in Rome on 2 May 1926.

His early studies were in Classics (philology and history) at the Sapienza University of Rome. In 1959 he became Professor of Ancient Christian Literature at the University of Cagliari, a post he held until 1969. In that year he became Professor of the History of Christianity at the Sapienza, a chair he held for three decades. He also taught at the Salesian Pontifical University and was an instructor at the Augustinianum from its founding in 1971 until 2016. He was made a national fellow of the Accademia dei Lincei in 1981. 

Simonetti died on 1 November 2017 in Rome, at the age of 91.

Awards and publications

In 2011, he was a co-recipient of the first Ratzinger Prize. At the time of his award, Pope Benedict XVI remarked of him, "Professor Simonetti has approached the world of the Fathers in a new way, showing us with accuracy and care, what the Fathers say from the historical viewpoint; they become our contemporaries who speak to us."

Simonetti's academic publications are numerous. His scholarship was focused in the domains of Biblical interpretation (in particular, Job, the Gospel of Matthew, etc.), in Christian antiquity (e.g. Origen), Christology, notably during the Arian crisis of the fourth century), and early Christian literature (including anthologies).

Several of his most recent articles have appeared in Vetera Christianorum, and have been highlights of most issues since 2000. This journal is published at Edipuglia for the Classics and Christianity Department of the University of Bari.

Selected works

References

External links
Author profile at Éditions du Cerf
Membership profile with the Accademia dei Lincei

1926 births
2017 deaths
Patristic scholars
Italian biblical scholars
Sapienza University of Rome alumni
Academic staff of the Sapienza University of Rome
Academic staff of the University of Cagliari
Ratzinger Prize laureates